Theodore M. Porter (born 1953) is a professor who specializes in the history of science in the Department of History at UCLA. He has authored several books, including The Rise of Statistical Thinking, 1820-1900; and Trust in Numbers: The Pursuit of Objectivity in Science and Public Life, the latter a vast reference for sociology of quantification. His most recent book, published by Princeton University Press in 2018, is Genetics in the Madhouse: The Unknown History of Human Heredity. He graduated from Stanford University with an A.B. in history in 1976 and earned a Ph.D. from Princeton University in 1981. In 2008, he was elected to the American Academy of Arts and Sciences.

Works 

 The Rise of Statistical Thinking (1986)
 Trust in Numbers: The Pursuit of Objectivity in Science and Public Life (1995)
 The Modern Social Sciences, with Dorothy Ross (2003)
 Karl Pearson: The Scientific Life in a Statistical Age (2004)
 Genetics in the Madhouse: The Unknown History of Human Heredity (2018)

External links
Professor Porter's Home-page

Notes and references

20th-century American historians
20th-century American male writers
21st-century American historians
21st-century American male writers
Living people
American historians of science
Philosophers of science
1953 births
American male non-fiction writers